= Akool =

American artificial intelligence company

Akool Inc.
- Type: Private
- Industry: Artificial intelligence Machine learning Software development
- Founded: 2022; 4 years ago
- Headquarters: Santa Clara, U.S.
- Area served: Worldwide
- Key people: Jiajun Lu (CEO)
- Website: akool.com

Akool Inc. is an American company headquartered in Palo Alto, California that specializes in generative artificial intelligence research and technologies. The company creates products and models for generating videos, images, and various multimedia content.

== History ==
The company was founded in 2022. In 2025, it was ranked first on the Inc. 5000.

== Services and technologies ==
Akool offers AI-powered tools for content creation, with emphasis on video generation and visual marketing applications.

- Avatar. Akool's Stream Avatar is an AI virtual avatar tool for live streaming and video content and has over 15 voices.
- Live Camera. Live Camera is Akool's real-time AI video generation technology, launched in May 2025. It is designed for video conferencing platforms.
- Face Swap. Akool's face swap technology allows users to replace faces in photos and videos. The technology has been used in marketing campaigns, including Qatar Airways' "AI Adventure" campaign.
- Video Translation. The platform provides automated translation and dubbing capabilities for video content.
